The C&C 25 is a series of Canadian sailboats, first built in 1973.

C&C also produced the unrelated C&C 25 Redline design.

Production
The boat series was built by C&C Yachts in Canada, but it is now out of production.

Design
Dick and Irene Steffen had owned a yacht dealership for C&C Yachts, that was located in Pointe Claire, Quebec. The dealership had done good business selling C&C boats, but the C&C line did not offer a boat smaller than the C&C 27 at that time. Dick Steffen was a competitive sailing racer and thought that there would be a good market for a C&C 24 foot keelboat. At his request C&C designed the boat, but decided not to proceed with production. Steffen bought the design from C&C, founding Mirage Yachts in February 1972 to build the design. The Mirage 24 sold well and quickly established a strong racing record in Midget Ocean Racing Club (MORC) class events. Caught off guard by the success of the boat, C&C decided to design a competitor, which they named the C&C 25, that was very similar to the Mirage 24's design.

The C&C 25 designs are both a small recreational keelboats, built predominantly of fiberglass, with wood trim. They have masthead sloop rigs, transom-hung rudders and fixed fin keels.

Variants

C&C 25 Mk I or 25-1
This model was designed by C&C Design and introduced in 1973. The boat is fitted with an inboard, saildrive or outboard motor. The boat has a PHRF racing average handicap of 222 with a high of 219 and low of 225.

C&C 25 Mk II or 25-2
This model was a complete redesign of the earlier C&C 25 by Robert W. Ball and introduced in 1980. The boat has a PHRF racing average handicap of 216 with a high of 238 and low of 207.

Operational history
In a review of the Mark II Michael McGoldrick wrote, "The newer version of the C&C 25 (the Mark II) was introduced in the early 1980s. Compared to its predecessor, it has a more modern look about it, a slightly deeper keel which allows it to point a little higher, and a truck cabin that is raised all the way forward (as opposed to the original cabin which sloped downwards towards the front of the boat). Despite all these changes, the new C&C 25 has the same hull design as the original model (The Mark I)."

In a 2010 review Steve Henkel wrote, "the C&C 25 came out in 1972 as a capable racer-cruiser with more than average space below for a 25-footer. Eventually a Mk II version was introduced in the early 1980s, with the same hull and general accommodations plan, but tweaked for more speed ... The newer version replaced the forward-sloping cabin with a longer trunk cabin featuring a bubble at the after end that furnishes a few inches more headroom without appearing top-heavy; a reshaped keel (less raked, deeper by 5 inches) designed for higher pointing; 190 pounds less ballast; and other minor changes. The net result of the tweaking for speed was an average PHRF rating of 222 for both Mk I and Mk II, in other words no change at all ... The galley seems squeezed up too close to the companionway ladder. Claustrophobic cooks beware."

See also

List of sailing boat types

Similar sailboats
Bayfield 25
Bombardier 7.6
Cal 25
Cal 2-25
Capri 25
Catalina 25
Catalina 250
Com-Pac 25
Dufour 1800
Hunter 25.5
Kirby 25
O'Day 25
MacGregor 25
Merit 25
Mirage 25
Northern 25
Redline 25
Sirius 26
Tanzer 25
US Yachts US 25
Watkins 25

References

External links

Keelboats
1970s sailboat type designs
Sailing yachts
Sailboat type designs by Robert W. Ball
Sailboat types built by C&C Yachts